Danielle Higgins (born 14 March 1990, previously known as Danielle Orr) is a retired Australian rules footballer who played for the Geelong Football Club in the AFL Women's (AFLW).

Higgins was recruited directly from Geelong's VFL Women's team prior to the club's inaugural season in the AFLW. She is the younger sister of Shaun Higgins, a footballer in the Australian Football League, and grew up in Hamlyn Heights, Victoria.

On 11 March 2022, Higgins announced her retirement from playing in the AFLW, and will finish her playing career at the end of the 2022 VFLW season.

References

External links 

Geelong Football Club (AFLW) players
1990 births
Living people
Australian rules footballers from Victoria (Australia)
Sportswomen from Victoria (Australia)
Australian netball players
Victorian Netball League players
Netball players from Victoria (Australia)